VIP Industries is India's largest luggage manufacturing company which manufactures luggage and travel accessories. It is based in Mumbai, India and is the world's second-largest and Asia's largest luggage maker. The company has more than 8,000 retail outlets across India and a network of retailers in 50 countries. It acquired United Kingdom-based luggage brand Carlton in 2004.

History 
The history of the company goes back to the year 1970. Since then, the company has recorded a sale of around 100 million pieces of luggage worldwide. Formerly, the company was known by the name Aristo Plast VIP Industries and it was incorporated in 1968. The company consisted of two wholly owned subsidiary companies, namely Blow Plast Retail Limited V.I.P. Industries Bangladesh Private Limited V.I.P. Industries BD Manufacturing Private Limited and V.I.P. Luggage BD Private Limited.  the company has one Indian and four overseas wholly owned subsidiaries.

Milestones 
1971 – at Nasik, the company's manufacturing factory was commissioned

1982 – at Jalgaon, a new manufacturing facility was inaugurated.

1983 – introduction of new technology, known as the NR mechanism, which kept the bags closed in an upside-down position.

1986 – set-up of a new manufacturing unit at Nagpur and introduction of a padded handle on the bags.

1989 – the company introduced a new brand by the name Alfa.

The dual-action lock was introduced in the bags.

1993 – at Sinnar a new manufacturing facility was set up.

1995 – the heat-sealing method was introduced. Also, the dual-material dimpled bumper was introduced, allowing for the rough usage of luggage.

1998 – the vertical access feature was launched.

2000 – similarly, other technologies such as the cable lock were also introduced. Soft luggage inside hard luggage i.e. Convipack was introduced by the company.

2002 – the paper frame and handle-locking mechanism were introduced.

2003 – the FM radio in the luggage category was launched.

2004 – the company acquired Carlton and extended its presence in the global market to around 65 countries.

2011 – four-wheel bag technology was used for the first time in India.

Awards 

 Rajiv Gandhi National Quality Award – 2003
 Golden Peacock Innovation Award – 2004

Brands 
The company's brands include:
 Aristocrat
 Alfa
 Caprese
 Carlton
 VIP Bags
 Skybags

References

External links 

Manufacturing companies based in Mumbai
Indian brands
Luggage brands
Luggage manufacturers
Manufacturing companies established in 1971
Plastics companies of India
Companies listed on the National Stock Exchange of India
Companies listed on the Bombay Stock Exchange